Muses for Richard Davis is the debut album by bassist Richard Davis recorded in 1969 and released on the German MPS label.

Reception
Allmusic awarded the album 3½ stars with a review stating, "It's a meeting of post-bop titans who not only know how to play, but also how to play together".

Track listing 
 "Milktrain" (Jimmy Knepper) - 6:03   
 "A Child is Born" (Thad Jones) - 5:00   
 "Softly, as in a Morning Sunrise" (Sigmund Romberg, Oscar Hammerstein II) - 9:25   
 "What Is It?" (Pepper Adams) - 7:00   
 "Muses for Richard Davis" (Roland Hanna) - 5:00   
 "Toe Tail Moon" (Jerry Dodgion) - 4:55

Personnel 
Richard Davis - bass
Freddie Hubbard - trumpet
Jimmy Knepper - trombone
Jerry Dodgion - alto saxophone
Eddie Daniels - tenor saxophone
Pepper Adams - baritone saxophone
Roland Hanna - piano
Louis Hayes - drums

References 

Richard Davis (bassist) albums
1970 albums
MPS Records albums
Albums produced by Joachim-Ernst Berendt